Countdown is a British game show involving word and number tasks that began airing in November 1982. It is broadcast on Channel 4 and is currently presented by Colin Murray, assisted by Rachel Riley, with resident lexicographer Susie Dent. It was the first programme to be aired on Channel 4, and 86 series have been broadcast since its debut on 2 November 1982. With over 7,900 episodes, Countdown is one of Britain's longest-running game shows, along with the original French version, Des chiffres et des lettres (Numbers & Letters), which has been running on French television continuously since 1965. Countdown was produced by Yorkshire Television and was recorded at The Leeds Studios for 27 years, before moving to the Manchester-based Granada Studios in 2009. Following the development of MediaCityUK, Countdown moved again in 2013 to the new purpose-built studios at Dock10, Greater Manchester.

The programme was presented by Richard Whiteley for 22 years until his death in June 2005. It was then presented by Des Lynam from October 2005 until December 2006, Des O'Connor from January 2007 until December 2008, Jeff Stelling from January 2009 until December 2011 and Nick Hewer from January 2012 until July 2021, with Colin Murray standing in for Hewer during part of the COVID-19 pandemic. The programme was then presented by Anne Robinson (its first female presenter) from July 2021 until July 2022. Colin Murray then returned on 14 July as a stand-in host. On 25 July 2022, it was announced that Les Dennis would guest host the show from 4–15 August followed by Jenny Eclair from 16 to 19 August because Colin Murray tested positive for COVID-19. Guest hosts would return later that year as part of the show’s 40th anniversary celebrations, with Floella Benjamin, Richard Coles, Trevor McDonald (for a second time) and Moira Stuart each hosting one week's worth of episodes. It was announced in January 2023 that Murray had moved from interim host to permanent host.

In the early years, the show had multiple assistant presenters, including Carol Vorderman who was hired for Series 1 to check calculations in the numbers round and her role expanded to include placing the number and letter tiles. She left in 2008 at the same time as Des O'Connor and was replaced by Rachel Riley. Susie Dent has been the permanent lexicographer since 2004 and appears in "Dictionary Corner" alongside a celebrity guest.

The two contestants in each episode compete in three game types: ten letters rounds, in which the contestants attempt to make the longest word possible from nine randomly chosen letters; four numbers rounds, in which the contestants must use arithmetic to reach a random target number from six other numbers; and the conundrum, a buzzer round in which the contestants compete to solve a nine-letter anagram. During the series heats, the winning contestant returns the next day until they either lose or retire with eight wins as an undefeated "Octochamp". The best eight contestants are invited back for the series finals, which are decided in knockout format. Contestants of exceptional skill have received national media coverage and the programme, as a whole, is widely recognised and parodied within British culture.

History

Origin
Countdown originated from the format of the French game show Des chiffres et des lettres (Numbers and Letters), created by Armand Jammot. After watching the programme, Belgian record executive Marcel Stellman brought the format to Britain on the belief it could be popular overseas and proposed his concept for the British version to several networks. The concept was purchased in the early 1980s by Yorkshire Television, which commissioned a series of eight shows under the title Calendar Countdown, which were broadcast between April and May 1982. Aimed at being a spin-off of their regional news programme Calendar, the programme's host deemed the natural choice for the concept. The spin-off was aired only in the Yorkshire area, with Whiteley earning the nickname of "Twice Nightly Whiteley" because of his daily appearances on both programmes. He was assisted by Cathy Hytner and Denise McFarland-Cruickshanks, who handled the letters and numbers rounds respectively.

By 1982, after an additional pilot episode was made with a refined format – an episode that was never broadcast – the show was bought by Channel 4, a new British television channel set to launch in November 1982, based on the refined concept. While Whiteley and Hytner from the original pilot were retained, the programme was renamed Countdown, and the format was expanded to include additional members in the hosting team, including letters and number experts. It was commissioned to be broadcast four times a week for seven weeks initially, but was such a success that it is still being recommissioned as of 2022.

An additional spin-off to the programme for young contestants was proposed at the time, dubbed Junior Countdown – the concept would be similar in format, but hosted by Gyles Brandreth and Ted Moult – but while a pilot was created, the proposal was abandoned after it was found to be highly flawed. 

Countdown was the first programme broadcast by Channel 4 when it launched on 2 November 1982, with Whiteley opening the programme with the line:

 —Richard Whiteley introducing the first Channel 4 episode of Countdown.

Whiteley tenure

Alongside the original cast from Calendar Countdown, the new format of the gameshow led to production staff seeking out further hostesses through advertising in national newspapers for young women to become a member of the programme's cast, with notable conditions about their involvement; in particular, those recruited for calculations found it made clear that as an applicant, their appearance would be less important than their skill as a mathematician. Amongst those recruited, Beverley Isherwood was hired to work alongside Hytner in handling the selection of number and letter tiles respectively, while Linda Barrett and Carol Vorderman were recruited for checking over calculations by contestants in the numbers round. In addition, a lexicographer was also required to form part of the format's "Dictionary Corner" segment, to verify words given by contestants in the letters round (see Letters round rules) and to point out any longer or otherwise interesting words available; such a role was aided by the show's producers, with no assistance from any computer program and accompanied by a celebrity guest for a set period on the programme – contributing words and providing entertainment through anecdotes, puzzles, poems and stories. Amongst these who have appeared on the programme are Nigel Rees, Jo Brand, Martin Jarvis, Richard Digance, Geoffrey Durham, Ken Bruce, Magnus Magnusson, Pam Ayres, Paul Zenon, Jenny Eclair, Al Murray, John Sergeant and Gyles Brandreth.

Over time, the additional hostesses on the programme were dropped by production staff, who retained Vorderman and assigned her primarily to handle the selection of letter and number tiles, as well as verifying contestant calculations. The programme frequently rotated between various lexicographers, including Richard Samson and Alison Heard, for each series, until in 2004 the role was permanently given to Susie Dent, after her debut on Countdown in 1992.

On 26 June 2005, Whiteley died after a failed heart operation. At the time, he had been slowly recovering from pneumonia earlier that year, which had prevented him recording further episodes. His death impacted the show, causing the episode scheduled for that day to be postponed by Channel 4 as a mark of respect, while the remaining episodes he had completed were aired after his death, the first of which was preceded by a tearful tribute from Vorderman. After the series' conclusion, Countdown was placed into hiatus from 1 July to determine how to proceed.

Post-Whiteley
In October 2005, Channel 4 announced that Des Lynam would take over as the main presenter, having previously participated in the celebrity edition (Celebrity Countdown) in April 1998. Lynam's tenure ran until December 2006, whereupon his demanding filming schedule forced him to resign from the programme. Channel 4 proposed reducing his travelling by moving filming from Leeds to a site closer to his residence in Worthing, West Sussex, but viewers reacted angrily to the idea and Lynam decided it would cause considerable disruption for many of the programme's camera crew.

In January 2007, Des O'Connor took over as the main presenter. During his tenure as host, Dent went on maternity leave over the winter of 2007–08, and Alison Heard temporarily replaced her on the programme until 6 February 2008. By July 2008, both O'Connor and Vorderman had announced that they would be leaving by the end of that year, after the end of the 59th series. While O'Connor was forced to leave in order to concentrate on other projects, Vorderman left after her offer to take a 33% salary decrease was rejected and production staff asked her to take a 90% pay cut; her agent stated that staff had told her that the show had survived without Whiteley and could "easily survive without you". Some media reports suggested that the new presenter would be either Rory Bremner, the early favourite, or Alexander Armstrong, but both ruled themselves out of the job. At the same time there was speculation that several prominent women, including Anthea Turner, Ulrika Jonsson and Myleene Klass, were strong candidates to take over Vorderman's job, but Channel 4 revealed that the role was to be assigned to a previously unknown male or female arithmetician with "charm and charisma".

When Des Lynam became the new presenter after Whiteley's death in 2005, the show regularly drew an average 1.7 million viewers every day; this was around half a million more than in the last few years of Richard Whiteley presenting. The Series 54 final, on 26 May 2006, attracted 2.5 million viewers. 3–4 million viewers had watched the show daily in its previous 16:15 slot. The drop in viewing figures following the scheduling change, coupled with the show's perceived educational benefits, even caused Labour MP Jonathan Shaw to table a motion in the UK Parliament requesting that the show be returned to its later time. Minor scheduling changes have subsequently seen the show move from 15:15 to 15:30, 15:45, 15:25, and 15:10.

In November 2008, Jeff Stelling was confirmed as the new host, while Oxford maths graduate Rachel Riley was confirmed as Vorderman's replacement. Stelling remained with the programme until the end of 2011, when his football commitments with Sky Sports forced him reluctantly to leave Countdown. Before his departure, The Apprentice star Nick Hewer was announced as his replacement, and he took over as the main presenter when his first episode aired on 9 January 2012. In 2020, during the ongoing COVID-19 pandemic, it was announced that Colin Murray, a frequent Dictionary Corner guest, would fill in for Hewer while he spent a period of time in isolation during the UK's second lockdown.

On 7 December 2020, Hewer announced that he would be stepping down as the host of Countdown at the end of series 83 in summer 2021. Hewer said it had been "privilege and a pleasure to take the helm of Countdown". It was then announced on 15 February 2021 that Anne Robinson, who first appeared on the show as a guest in Dictionary Corner in 1987, would take over from Hewer at the start of series 84. Hewer's final show aired on 25 June 2021. On 28 June 2021, Robinson became the show’s first female host in its 39-year history. In May 2022, it is announced that she would be leaving the show after just one year, with Murray taking over for the majority of series 86. In total, Robinson recorded 265 episodes, which equates to two full series, and the first three weeks of series 86.

Character

Countdown quickly established cult status within British television – an image which it maintains today, despite the loss of key presenters. The programme's audience comprises mainly students, homemakers and pensioners, because of the "teatime" broadcast slot and inclusive appeal of its format and presentation. Countdown has been one of Channel 4's most-watched programmes for over twenty years, but has never won a major television award.

On each episode, the prize for defeating the reigning champion is a teapot that is styled to resemble the renowned clock used in each round. Introduced in December 1998, the pot is custom-made and can only be obtained by winning a game on the programme. Defeated contestants receive an assortment of Countdown-themed merchandise as a parting gift.

At first, the prize for the series winner was a leather-bound copy of the twenty-volume Oxford English Dictionary, worth over £4,000. Between 2011 and 2021, the prize consisted of ordinary hardback twenty-one-volume dictionaries, a laptop computer and a lifetime subscription to Oxford Online (replaced by a MacBook pro laptop by series 68). David Acton, winner of Series 31, opted for a CD-ROM version of the dictionaries, not wanting to accept leather-bound books owing to his strict veganism, and he donated the monetary difference to charity. The paperback dictionaries, given to the series winner, were last featured in Series 83; they were removed as they were considered significantly outdated.

Runner-up prizes in the finals increased over the years from a £100 book voucher to £250, later to £500, and then £1,000. Beginning with series 68, the runner-up in the finals wins a laptop.

Since Series 54 in 2006, the series champion also receives the Richard Whiteley Memorial Trophy, in memory of the show's original presenter.

Though the style and colour scheme of the set have changed many times (and the show itself moved to Manchester, after more than 25 years in Leeds), the clock has always provided the centrepiece and, like the clock music composed by Alan Hawkshaw, is an enduring and well-recognised feature of Countdown. Executive producer John Meade once commissioned Hawkshaw to revise the music for extra intensity to introduce at the start of series 31 in January 1996; after hundreds of complaints from viewers, the old tune was reinstated after just 12 shows. The original clock featured until September 2013, when it was replaced.

Celebrations
The first episode of Countdown was repeated on 1 October 2007 on More4 and also on 2 November 2007 on Channel 4; this was as part of Channel 4 at 25, a season of programmes to celebrate its 25th birthday.

On 2 November 2007, Countdown celebrated its twenty-fifth anniversary and aired a special 'birthday episode'. The two players were 2006 winner Conor Travers and 2002 winner Chris Wills. However, for the rounds, VIP guests selected the letters and numbers. Guests included Gordon Brown, Amir Khan and Richard Attenborough. A statement from the French TV network France Télévisions was read out on air by Vorderman to commend Channel 4 on its success of Countdown.

On 26 March 2010, Queen Elizabeth II congratulated Countdown for amassing 5,000 episodes. On 5 September 2014, the programme received a Guinness World Record at the end of its 6,000th show for the longest-running television programme of its kind during the course of its 71st series.

In September 2014, Countdown entered the Guinness World Records for the most series of a TV game show broadcast.

Format
Countdown has occupied a daytime broadcast slot since its inception, originally in a 30-minute format. Since 2001, an episode lasts around 45 minutes including advertising breaks. During the normal series, the winner of each game returns for the next day's show. A player who wins eight games is declared an "octochamp" and retires from the programme. At the end of the series, the eight best players (ranked first by number of wins, then by total score if required to break a tie) are invited back to compete in the series finals. They are seeded in a knockout tournament, with the first seed playing the eighth seed, the second playing the seventh, and so on. The winner of this knockout, which culminates in the Grand Final, becomes the series champion. Each series lasts around six months, with about 125 episodes.

Approximately every four series, a Champion of Champions tournament takes place. For this, sixteen of the best players to have appeared since the previous Championship are invited back for another knockout tournament. The producer, former contestant Damian Eadie, decides which players to include, but typically the tournament includes the series winners and other noteworthy contestants. Series 33 was designated a "Supreme Championship", in which 56 of the best contestants from all the previous series returned for another knockout tournament. Series 10 champion Harvey Freeman was declared Supreme Champion after beating Allan Saldanha in the final. There are also occasional special episodes, in which past contestants return for themed matches. For example, David Acton and Kenneth Michie returned for a rematch of their Series 31 final, while brothers and former contestants Sanjay and Sandeep Mazumder played off against each other on 20 December 2004.

Since the change to 45-minute episodes, the game has been split into three sections, separated by advertising breaks. The first section contains two letters rounds and a numbers round, the second has two letters rounds and a numbers round followed by the anecdote from the Dictionary Corner guest and then a further two letters rounds and a numbers round, while the last section has two letters rounds, Susie Dent's "Origins of Words" item, two further letters rounds, a numbers round and a final "Conundrum" puzzle. With the exception of the Conundrum, the contestants swap control after every round so that each of them has control for five letters rounds and two numbers rounds.

At the end of the first two sections, the host poses a "Teatime Teaser" for the viewers, giving a set of short words and a cryptic clue to a single word that can be anagrammed from them. The solution is revealed at the start of the next section. (Example: Given the words SAD MOODY and the clue "We'll all be sad and moody when this arrives," the solution would be DOOMSDAY.) When the Teatime Teaser was first introduced, the anagrams were seven letters long; they were later extended to eight, then to nine in late 2016, before returning to eight in 2020.

Letters round
The contestant in control chooses between two stacks of face-down letter tiles, one containing vowels (A-E-I-O-U only) and the other consonants, and the assistant reveals the top tile from that stack and places it on the board. This is done nine times, and the final grouping must contain at least three vowels and four consonants. The contestants then have 30 seconds to form the longest single word they can, using the nine revealed letters; no letter may be used more often than it appears in the selection. The frequencies of the letters within each stack are weighted according to their frequency in natural English, in the same manner as Scrabble. For example, there are many Ns and Rs in the consonant stack, but only one Q. The letter frequencies are altered by the producers from time to time, so any published list does not necessarily reflect the letters used in any particular programme. The two stacks of tiles are not replenished between rounds.

Both contestants write down the words they form, in case they select the same one. After time runs out, the host asks the contestants to declare their word lengths, starting with the contestant who chose the letters. The host then asks the discovered words, starting with the shorter declared length. If one contestant has not written their word down in time, they must state this fact; if both then declare the same length, that contestant must give their word first to prevent cheating. If both contestants state that they have not written their words, the host allows them a moment to do so; this is typically edited out of the final broadcast. The contestant with the longer valid word scores one point per letter, or 18 points if they have used all nine. If the words are identical or of the same length, both contestants score. In the former case, the contestants must show their written words to each other as proof that they are the same. If a contestant is visually impaired, Dictionary Corner will verify the word. Contestants who inaccurately declare the length of their word score zero, even if the word is valid. Each round ends with Dictionary Corner revealing the longest words and/or any unusual ones that can be formed from the available letters, aided by the production team.

Any word which appears in the Oxford Dictionary of English is valid, as well as accepted forms of them that may not be explicitly listed. Examples are:
 Common nouns and their plurals
 Verbs and their inflections (e.g. "escape", "escaped", "escaping")
 Comparative and superlative forms of adjectives (if the adjective is more than one syllable, the form must be explicitly listed)
 Plurals of foods specified as mass nouns that may be ordered in restaurants (e.g. "pastas", as in "We'll have two pastas")

Words that are not allowed include:
 Terms which are always capitalised, including proper nouns (e.g. "Jane" or "London")
 Hyphenated terms
 Words that are never used alone (e.g. "gefilte"; only used as part of "gefilte fish")
 Since 2002, American spellings of words (e.g. "flavour" and "signalled" are allowed, but "flavor" and "signaled" are not). Notably, though, words with the suffix -ize (e.g. "realize") and derived words thereof (e.g. "realizing") are permitted in addition to the corresponding -ise spellings (e.g. "realise"), as the Oxford Dictionary of English regards both as British English spellings per the Oxford spelling convention.

Example:
Contestant One chooses five consonants, then three vowels, then another consonant.
Selection is:
G Y H D N O E U R
Contestant One declares 7, while Contestant Two declares 8.
Contestant One reveals younger, but Contestant Two reveals hydrogen and scores 8 points. Contestant One does not score.
Dictionary Corner notes greyhound, which would have scored 18 points for using all nine letters.

Numbers round
The contestant in control chooses six of 24 shuffled face-down number tiles, arranged into two groups: 20 "small numbers" (two each of 1 to 10), and four "large numbers" of 25, 50, 75, and 100. Some special episodes replace the large numbers with 12, 37, 62, and 87. The contestant decides how many large numbers are to be used, from none to all four, after which the six tiles are randomly drawn and placed on the board. A random three-digit target number is then generated by an electronic machine, known as "CECIL" (which stands for Countdown's Electronic Calculator In Leeds). The contestants have 30 seconds to work out a sequence of calculations with the numbers whose final result is as close to the target number as possible. They may use only the four basic operations of addition, subtraction, multiplication and division, and do not have to use all six numbers. A number may not be used more times than it appears on the board. Division can only be performed if the result has no remainder (i.e., the divisor is a factor of the dividend). Fractions are not allowed, and only positive integers may be obtained as a result at any stage of the calculation. As in the letters rounds, any contestant who does not write down their calculations in time must go first if both declare the same result, and both contestants must show their work to each other if their results and calculations are identical.

Only the contestant whose result is closer to the target number scores points: ten for reaching it exactly, seven for being between one and five from the target, and five for being within six and ten from the target. Contestants score no points for being more than ten away, if their calculations are flawed, or if they take too long to give a solution after saying they have not written it down. Both score if they reach the same result, or if their results are the same distance away. Should neither contestant reach the target exactly, the assistant is called upon to attempt a solution, either immediately or at a later time during the episode.

Example:
Contestant One requests two large numbers and four small numbers.
Selection is:
75 50 2 3 8 7
Randomly generated target is:
812
Contestant One declares 813, while Contestant Two declares 815.
Contestant One is closer and so reveals: 75 + 50 – 8 = 117, and 117 × 7 – (3 × 2) = 813, which scores 7 points for being 1 away. Contestant Two does not score.
Assistant notes: 50 + 8 = 58, and 7 × 2 × 58 = 812, which would have scored 10 points.

In some games, there are many ways to reach the target exactly; the example target above could also be reached by 7 × (75 + 50 + 2 – 8 – 3) = 812. Not all games are solvable, and for a few selections it is impossible even to get within 10, most commonly when a contestant picks six small numbers and the target number is quite large. There is a tactical element in selecting how many large numbers to include. One large and five small numbers is the most popular selection, despite two large numbers giving the best chance of the game being solvable exactly. Selections with zero or four large numbers are generally considered the hardest.

The 24 tiles are laid out in four rows, the topmost of which contains only the four large numbers. The contestant may specify how many tiles to draw from each row, or simply state how many large and small numbers will be used; in the latter case, the assistant draws the tiles randomly. The numbers are usually placed on the board from right to left, starting with the small ones, but have occasionally been displayed in scrambled order. On rare occasions, the contestant has declined to make any choices, in which case the assistant selects the tiles. Unlike the letters round, the pool of tiles is fully replenished after each numbers round.

Example:
Contestant requests one from the top (large), two from the second row (small), and three more from the top (large).
Selection is (in disorder):
50 10 6 25 100 75

A special edition, broadcast on 15 March 2010, for two previous series champions, Kirk Bevins and Chris Davies, used instead of the usual four large numbers, the numbers 12, 37 and two numbers unrevealed for the duration of the show. In a further special broadcast on 16 August 2010 between the Series 59 finalists Charlie Reams and Junaid Mubeen, the other two numbers were revealed to be 62 and 87.

Conundrum
The final round of the game is the Countdown Conundrum, in which the contestants are shown a combination of two or three words with a total of nine letters. They have 30 seconds to form a single word using all the letters and must buzz in to respond (a bell for the champion and a buzzer for the challenger). Each contestant is allowed only one guess and the first to answer correctly scores 10 points. If a contestant buzzes-in and either responds incorrectly or fails to give any response, they are frozen out and the remaining time is given to the opponent. If neither contestant can solve it, the presenter asks whether anyone in the audience knows the answer and if so, chooses someone to call it out (this practice was stopped temporarily in 2009 to avoid difficulties with camera angles after the studio layout was changed). The Conundrum is designed to have only one solution, but on occasion more than one valid word is found by happenstance (e.g. MISSATTEE can become both ESTIMATES and STEAMIEST). If this happens, any of these results are accepted. On rare occasions, the Conundrum is presented as a single nine-letter word that must be anagrammed into another one (e.g. SMARTENED becoming TRADESMEN).

If the contestants' scores are within ten points of each other going into this round, it is referred to as a "Crucial Countdown Conundrum." Since ten points are at stake, the contestant who solves it will either win the game or force a tiebreaker. If the scores are tied after the Conundrum, additional Conundrums are played until the tie is broken. There have been several instances in which two Conundrums were used to decide the winner, but only a handful of episodes have required three. There have also been cases when even more Conundrums have been required to provide a winner, but not all have been included in the transmitted programme.

Example:
Conundrum is revealed:
C H I N A L U N G
Contestant One buzzes-in and says launching. This answer is revealed to be correct and Contestant One scores 10 points.

Evolution
The rules of Countdown are derived from those of Des chiffres et des lettres. Perhaps the biggest difference is the length of the round; DCedL's number rounds are each 45 seconds long to Countdown's 30. DCedL also features "duels", in which players compete in short tasks such as mental arithmetic problems, extracting two themed words from another, or being asked to spell a word correctly. Other minor differences include a different numbers scoring system (9 points for an exact solution, or 6 points for the closest inexact solution in DCedL) and the proportion of letters to numbers rounds (10 to 4 in Countdown, 8 to 4 in DCedL).

The pilot episode followed significantly different rules from the current ones. Most noticeably, only eight letters were selected for each letters round. If two contestants offered a word of the same length, or an equally close solution to a numbers game, then only the contestant who made the selection for that round was awarded points. Also, only five points were given for an exact numbers solution, three for a solution within 5, and one point for the closer solution, no matter how far away.

The set design has changed over the years, but the centrepiece has always been the Countdown clock. The original set was used from its launch in 1982 until Series 17 in early 1989. A new brown set was introduced in Series 18 in July 1989 but remained in use for less than two years. Series 22 from July 1991 saw the introduction of the familiar and long-lived "Wings" set, which was used in its original form until 1995. Series 31 in January 1996 saw its colour scheme change to purple and changed again to tangerine at the end of 1999 alongside updated score displays. January 2003 saw the set updated to a new pink and purple striped theme with the letters and numbers boards now on separate islands rather than being integrated into the set. Six years later, in January 2009, the set received another redesign with a numerical blue theme and the letters and numbers boards mounted on opposite sides of a single display stand. New modern displays for the scores and the numbers round came in January 2013 while the set received a slight redesign in July 2017 while retaining the blue background which has been used to up to the most recent season.

Until the end of Series 21, if the two contestants had equal scores after the first conundrum, the match was declared a draw and they both returned for the next show. A significant change in the format occurred in September 2001, when the show was expanded from nine rounds and 30 minutes to the current fifteen rounds and 45 minutes. The older format was split into two halves, each with three letters and one numbers game, plus the conundrum at the end of the second half. When the format was expanded to fifteen rounds, Richard Whiteley continued to refer jokingly to the three segments of the show as "halves". Under the old format, Grand Finals were specially extended shows of fourteen rounds, but now all shows use a fifteen-round format.

The rules regarding which words are permitted have changed with time. American spelling was allowed until 2002, and more unspecified inflections were assumed to be valid.

In September 2007, an "Origin of Words" feature was added to the show, in which Susie Dent explains the origin of a word or phrase she has been researching. This feature follows the eighth letters round, partway through the third section of each episode. The feature was omitted during the time that Dent was absent for maternity leave, and was reinstated upon her return.

When the 15-round format was first introduced in September 2001, the composition of the rounds was different from that used by the programme today. The three sections each had five rounds, four letters rounds and one numbers round in each of the first two sections, with three letters rounds, one numbers round and the conundrum in the third section. This meant that there was a slight imbalance, whereby one contestant made the letters sections for six rounds, but had the choice of the numbers selection just once, whereas the other contestant chose letters five times and numbers twice. The Dictionary Corner guest's spot was immediately before the first advertising break, and Susie Dent's Origin of Words spot preceded the second numbers game shortly before the second break. The change to the present format was made on 25 March 2013, three weeks into the second section of Series 68, to comply with Channel 4's decision to increase the amount of advertising and to alter the times when they occur during the programme, therefore reducing Countdowns actual show length from 36 to 35 minutes.

Notable contestants
Since Countdown's debut in 1982, there have been nearly 8,000 televised games and 86 complete series. There have also been sixteen Champion of Champions tournaments, the most recent in January 2023.

Several of Countdowns most successful contestants have received national media coverage. Teenager Julian Fell set a record score of 146 in December 2002. In 2006, 14-year-old Conor Travers became the youngest series champion in the show's history, and 11-year-old Kai Laddiman became the youngest octochamp for 20 years. Conor Travers went on to win the 30th Anniversary Champion of Champions series in March 2013 with a record-equalling top score of 146. On 17 January 2019, in the quarter-final of the 15th Champion of Champions tournament, Zarte Siempre, who eventually won that tournament, set a new record score of 150. This record was beaten in May 2019 by Elliott Mellor's score of 152. A new record was set on 29 September 2022 when contestant Tom Stevenson scored 154. This record score of 154 was equalled by contestant Cillian McMulkin on 31 January 2023. 

At eight years old, Tanmay Dixit was the youngest player ever to appear on the show, achieving two wins in March 2005. He also received press attention for his offerings in the letters round, which included fannies and farted.

On Christmas Day 1987, Nic Brown set the highest score difference ever achieved in a standard 14-round game, beating Joel Salkin 108–36, a margin of 72 points. Brown also went on to become one of the only two contestants ever to achieve an undefeated 'grand slam' – becoming an Octochamp, winning a series, and winning a Championship of Champions.

In April 2013, Giles Hutchings, a student at Royal Grammar School, Guildford, broke the record for the highest octochamp score, amassing 965 points over 8 games. He went on to win series 68. The record was beaten by Dylan Taylor, who achieved an octochamp score of 974 in August 2013, but he lost the Grand Final of that series. In 2019 the record was beaten by 87 points by teenager Elliott Mellor, who became the first octochamp to break the 1,000-point barrier, scoring a total of 1,061 over his eight preliminary games. Echoing Dylan's appearance, Mellor was pipped to the series title, finishing as runner up. Three former contestants have returned to Countdown as part of the production team: Michael Wylie, Mark Nyman (as producer, and occasional lexicographer in Dictionary Corner) and Damian Eadie (the current series producer).

In 1998, sixteen celebrities were invited to play Celebrity Countdown, a series of eight games broadcast every Thursday evening over the course of eight weeks. The celebrities included Whiteley's successor Des Lynam, who beat Siân Lloyd. The highest and lowest scores were posted in the same game when TV's Hugh Fearnley-Whittingstall beat wine critic Jilly Goolden 47–9.

Richard Whiteley and Carol Vorderman competed in another special episode on Christmas Day 1997. For this game, the presenter's chair was taken by William G. Stewart, the host of fellow Channel 4 game show Fifteen to One. Susie Dent took over Vorderman's duties, and Mark Nyman occupied Dictionary Corner, accompanied by Magnus Magnusson. The game was close-fought, and decided only by the crucial Countdown conundrum mistletoe which Vorderman solved in two seconds, after Whiteley had inadvertently buzzed after one second, because when he regularly hosted the show, he hit the button to reveal the conundrum and kept his old habit up.

Contestants who have or had become notable for other reasons include Nuts magazine editor-at-large Pete Cashmore, rugby player Ayoola Erinle, footballers Neil MacKenzie, Clarke Carlisle and Matt Le Tissier, musicians Jon Marsh and Nick Saloman, comedian Alex Horne, noted Irish playwright Peter Sheridan and professional darts referee Kirk Bevins, who won Series 60 and was a quarter-finalist in the 30th Birthday Championship.

In popular culture

Countdown is often referenced and parodied in British culture.

Assorted allusions
In 1992, Saint Etienne used a sample of the host's lead-in for "today's Countdown Conundrum" as the opening for the track "Stoned to Say the Least".

In the 2002 film About a Boy, protagonist Will Freeman is a regular viewer of Countdown.

The Doctor Who episode "Bad Wolf" (2005) mentions a futuristic version of Countdown, in which the goal is to stop a bomb from exploding in 30 seconds. Countdown was referenced again in a later series in "Last of the Time Lords" (2007), where Professor Docherty expresses a keen fondness for the show and how it "hasn't been the same since Des took over—both Deses".

Fairport Convention guitarist Simon Nicol titled one of his solo albums Consonant Please Carol, echoing one of the show's catchphrases.

Videogames

A Countdown videogame was released for the Nintendo DS and Nintendo Wii in 2009. There have also been mobile apps of the game released.

Outtakes
Countdown has also generated a number of widely viewed outtakes, with the letters occasionally producing a word that was deemed unsuitable for the original broadcast. A round in which Dictionary Corner offered the word gobshite featured in TV's Finest Failures in 2001 (the actual episode aired on 10 January 2000), and in one episode from 1991, contestants Gino Corr and Lawrence Pearse both declared the word wankers. This was edited out of the programme but has since appeared on many outtakes shows. When contestant Charlie Reams declared wankers on 21 October 2008 edition, the declaration was kept in but the word itself was bleeped. Other incidents with only marginally rude words (including wanker, singular) have made it into the programme as they appeared, such as those with Tanmay Dixit referenced above, a clip from a 2001 episode in which the word fart appeared as the first four letters on the board (which also featured on 100 Greatest TV Moments from Hell), and a round where an anagram of the word fucked appeared on the board in the string "A U O D F C K E G", although neither player chose to use the word, and Dictionary Corner was able to find two seven-letter words that could have been made from the board's offerings. On 2 February 2017, the board for the letters round was "M T H I A E D H S", and with both players offering sevens, Dictionary Corner found the word "shithead", which was bleeped out in the audio and censored on-screen with the poo emoji.

Humour
The programme is mentioned in an episode of Irish sitcom Father Ted entitled "The Old Grey Whistle Theft,” Still Game (in the episode "Wireless") and is also referenced in the very first episode of Little Britain from 2003. BBC impression sketch show Dead Ringers parodies Countdown numerous times, and another television programme, The Big Breakfast, parodied Countdown in a feature called "Countdown Under". In a sketch "Countdown to Hell" from the comedy show A Bit of Fry and Laurie, Stephen Fry lampooned Richard Whiteley's punning style and Hugh Laurie played one of the contestants, while Gyles Brandreth (played by Steve Steen), presented with the letters ",” got the (non-)word "sloblock" (supposedly meaning exactly the same as "bollocks"). The show also has a fleeting reference in British sitcom The Office when Chris 'Finchy' Finch attempts to insult temporary worker Ricky when he explains he had a job to pay for his studies. Finchy states that it probably was 'professor in charge of watching Countdown every day', commenting on its student audience, and referring to the fact anyone watching Countdown during its 'hometime' time slot cannot be out at work.

The format of the show has been parodied on Have I Got News for You. In 1999, when Whiteley was a guest, the numbers game was copied along with the clock music and at the end of the show was a conundrum, "PHANIOILS", to which the answer was Ian Hislop. In 2004, when Vorderman was a guest, one of the usual rounds was replaced with a conundrum round based on the week's news. When Vorderman hosted Have I Got News in 2006, one of the rounds was the "Spinning Conundrum Numbers Round", altering the "Spinning Headlines" round by adding a number to a picture relating to the week's news; at the end of the round, the six numbers from the picture were used for a numbers game.

Richard Whiteley was the victim of a practical joke while presenting the show in 1998. The contestants and rounds had been planted as part of a "Gotcha!", a regular prank feature on the light entertainment show Noel's House Party. In the prank, both the two contestants and Dictionary Corner missed the word something from the letters OMETHINGS, and from another selection, both of the contestants declared "I've got diarrhoea" referring to the selection. In the numbers round that followed, the male contestant "answered" the puzzle by concatenating 6, 2, and 3 to make the target of 623. Whiteley did not uncover the joke until House Party presenter Noel Edmonds appeared on the set, having revealed the unusually short conundrum of HOGCAT to be "gotcha" at the end of the programme.

In a 2003 episode of Top Gear, Richard Whiteley participated in the "Star in a Reasonably Priced Car" segment. Before Whiteley's lap was shown, presenter Jeremy Clarkson played a game of Countdown with Whiteley, using words such as imin (Mini), sexul (Lexus), nevor lard (Land Rover), mushi bits(Mitsubishi) and pianos shiazu (Hispano-Suiza).

It was also referred to on Harry Hill's TV Burp twice. The first time it was referred to was when "Dev" (Coronation Street) made a sound like Countdown end of thirty seconds time. The second time was when the competition "Where Has The Knitted Character Been This Week?" had the answer "on Rachel Riley's chair".

On 2 July 2010, the game was featured in the Season 4 episode "The Final Countdown" of The IT Crowd. Moss stuns everyone by declaring that the 9 letter string TNETENNBA is in fact a word. Later, Moss becomes an octochamp and is consequently invited into an underground club named "8+,” where he competes in a game of "Street Countdown" as part of a spoof of Boogie Town. The episode featured a cameo from Gyles Brandreth, a regular contributor to Dictionary Corner.

British entertainer Stevie Riks has parodied the show in one of his many YouTube comedy videos.

In an episode from spring 2011, the Blackpool-supporting producer of the show arranged the conundrum PNECRISIS ("priciness"), poking fun at their local rivals Preston North End's relegation from the Championship in the 2010–11 season.

Non-canon games
The game has also been played on a number of different programs, notably as the first challenge in "What's Next" on Ant and Dec's Saturday Night Takeaway, featuring the pair versus one of the duo's old head teachers. In 2010, it was played as a shopping task on the final Channel 4 series of Celebrity Big Brother, with a team of housemates competing in the house against the then current champion, Chris Davies, in the Countdown studio via satellite. The housemates failed this task.

Transmissions
Regular series

Masters series

Celebrity series

Specials

Spin-offs
 Countdown Masters was a regular spot within The Channel Four Daily from 1989 to 1992. It had the same hosts and rules as the standard game but was played in shorter chunks. It was abbreviated: for example, the letters were chosen all in one go as "x vowels and y consonants".
 8 Out of 10 Cats Does Countdown has comedian Jimmy Carr as host and team captains Jon Richardson and Sean Lock (until his death in 2021) as regular contestants. Dent and Riley fill their normal roles. It uses similar rules to the standard game, but has a strong comedy element, a reduced number of rounds, and two-person teams. It began in 2012 and continues airing new episodes.
 Celebrity Countdown has celebrities competing on the show without the cast of 8 Out of 10 Cats'' and with its usual presenters. Only two seasons have been produced, the first in 1998 and the second in 2019.

See also
 List of Countdown champions
 International versions of Countdown

Notes

References

 Countdown: Spreading the Word (Granada Media, 2001)

External links

 
 
 
 
 The Countdown Page, results from every game up to 16 December 2011
 The Countdown Wiki
 An analysis of the game based on a scientific article published at the 2015 Global Conference on Artificial Intelligence
 An online version of the game featuring Des Lynam, Carol, and Susie

 
English-language television shows
Television series by Yorkshire Television